San Marco this name has been borne by at least three ships of the Italian Navy and may refer to:

 , a  launched in 1908 and found sunk in 1945.
 , launched in 1941 as the  Giulio Germanico she was rebuilt as a destroyer and renamed in 1955. She was decommissioned in 1971
 , a  launched in 1987. 

Italian Navy ship names